"Dust in Gravity is a song by Canadian ambient pop band Delerium featuring vocals by Canadian/Jamaican singer Kreesha Turner. It's the first and only single of their remix album "Remixed: The Definitive Collection".
The song premiered on Delerium's official SoundCloud channel on November 9, 2009.
The iTunes single was released later in the month, but the track was not officially sent to radio until March 2, 2010, on the same day as the iTunes remix EP was released.

Remixes were made by Groove Police, Sultan & Ned Shepard, Nervo, Niels van Gogh vs. Dave Ramone and Streets Of Fandango.

Music video
The music video premiered on December 8, 2009, on Delerium's official label's YouTube channel. The video featuring a dishevelled looking Kreesha walking around a town, watching peoples' problems as strange shapes appear in the sky.
Later, she appears in her self-called 'goddess look', as the characters problems each resolve. As the shapes over-take the sky, the screen pans in on Turner, and then fades to black.

Track listing
 Digital Release - 2009
 "Dust in Gravity (Radio Edit)" - 3:34
 "Dust in Gravity (Album Version)" - 3:59

 CD Promo - 2010
 "Dust in Gravity (Radio Edit)" - 3:34
 "Dust in Gravity (Groove Police Remix)" - 6:43
 "Dust in Gravity (Groove Police Dub Remix)" - 6:06
 "Dust in Gravity (Sultan & Ned Shepard Remix)" - 7:47
 "Dust in Gravity (Sultan & Ned Shepard Dub Remix)" - 7:30
 "Dust in Gravity (Nervo Remix)" - 6:35
 "Dust in Gravity (Nervo Dub Remix)" - 6:06
 "Dust in Gravity (Niels Van Gogh Vs. Dave Ramone Remix)" - 6:22
 "Dust in Gravity (Streets Of Fandango Remix)" - 5:45
 "Dust in Gravity (Album Version)" - 3:59

 Digital Release Remixes - 2010
 "Dust in Gravity (Groove Police Radio Edit)" - 3:24
 "Dust in Gravity (Sultan & Ned Shepard Radio Edit)" - 4:02
 "Dust in Gravity (Nervo Radio Edit)" - 3:35
 "Dust in Gravity (Niels Van Gogh Vs. Dave Ramone Remix)" - 6:24
 "Dust in Gravity (Groove Police Remix)" - 6:43
 "Dust in Gravity (Sultan & Ned Shepard Remix)" - 7:47
 "Dust in Gravity (Nervo Remix)" - 6:37
 "Dust in Gravity (Streets Of Fandango Remix)" - 5:44

 CD Maxi-single - 2010
 "Dust in Gravity (Radio Edit)" - 3:34
 "Dust in Gravity (Sultan & Ned Shepard Remix)" - 7:47
 "Dust in Gravity (Groove Police Remix)" - 6:43
 "Dust in Gravity (Nervo Remix)" - 6:37
 "Dust in Gravity (Album Version)" - 3:59
 "Dust in Gravity (Sultan & Ned Shepard Dub Remix)" - 7:31
 "Dust in Gravity (Groove Police Dub Remix)" - 6:31
 "Dust in Gravity (Nervo Dub Remix)" - 6:07
 "Dust in Gravity (Streets Of Fandango Remix)" - 5:46
 "Dust in Gravity (Sultan & Ned Shepard Radio Edit)" - 4:02
 "Dust in Gravity (Groove Police Radio Edit)" - 3:23
 "Dust in Gravity (Nervo Radio Edit)" - 3:34

Charts
The song received much Canadian and American airplay, and charted at number one on the Billboard American Dance charts.

Weekly charts

Year-end charts

See also
 List of number-one dance singles of 2010 (U.S.)

References

2010 singles
Delerium songs
Kreesha Turner songs
2010 songs
Nettwerk Records singles
Songs written by Rhys Fulber
Songs written by Troy Samson
Songs written by Kreesha Turner
Songs written by Bill Leeb